Maximilian Egon II, Prince of Fürstenberg (13 October 1863 – 11 August 1941) was a German landowner, investor and nobleman who was the head of the House of Fürstenberg from 1896 to 1941.

Background
Born as Prince Maximilian Egon Christian Karl Aloys Emil Leo Richard Anton zu Fürstenberg, he was the son of Prince Maximilian Egon zu Fürstenberg and his wife, Countess Leontina von Khevenhüller-Metsch. He had a younger brother, born in 1867, named Prince Karl Emil Egon zu Fürstenberg.

Life and career

A close friend and adviser of Emperor Wilhelm II of Germany, Max of Fürstenberg inherited territorial titles in Prussia, Austria, Hungary, Württemberg and Baden, and by virtue of them had a seat in the House of Lords in each of the five states.  Until the First World War, he was vice-president of the Prussian House of Lords.

His principal residence was at Donaueschingen, near the source of the Danube, where he owned a castle and great deer forests. Emperor Wilhelm II frequently visited him there, and Max invariably accompanied the Emperor on his hunting expeditions and Norwegian trips. As well as his vast ancestral forests, he also owned coal mines, hotels and breweries.

Although he was a member of the high Roman Catholic Uradel who had long stood aloof from party politics, after meeting Adolf Hitler and Ernst Roehm in November 1933, Max became enthusiastic about Hitler's leadership, commenting that "It was wonderful, to be able to meet such a great man".

The same year, 1933, he joined the Nazi Party and the SA. In 1938, he was appointed to the rank of Standartenführer.

Marriage and issue
By his marriage to Countess Irma von Schönborn-Buchheim, he had three sons and two daughters:

 Karl Egon V zu Fürstenberg (1891–1973)
 Leontina zu Fürstenberg (1892–1979)
 Anna zu Fürstenberg (1894–1928)
 Maximilian Egon zu Fürstenberg (1896–1959)
 Friedrich Eduard zu Fürstenberg (1898–1916)

He also had an illegitimate daughter, Marie-Louise-Auguste von Almey, by a liaison with Baroness Marguerite von Almey.

He died in 1941, during the Second World War, and was succeeded by his son, Karl Egon V (1891–1973).

Gallery

Honours and awards

Citations

General references

External links 
 

1863 births
1941 deaths
Businesspeople from Baden-Württemberg
Maximilian Egon II
German landowners
Members of the Prussian House of Lords
Nazi Party politicians
Sturmabteilung personnel
Knights of the Golden Fleece of Austria
Knights of the Holy Sepulchre
Knights of Malta